The women's 200 metre individual medley SM10 event at the 2014 Commonwealth Games as part of the swimming programme took place on 29 July at the Tollcross International Swimming Centre in Glasgow, Scotland.

The medals were presented by Sam Ramsamy, Vice President of FINA and the quaichs were presented by Adam Paker, Chief Executive Officer of Commonwealth Games England.

Records
Prior to this competition, the existing world and Commonwealth Games records were as follows.

Results

Heats

Finals

References

Women's 200 metre individual medley SM10
Commonwealth Games
2014 in women's swimming